Tamotsu (written: 保) is a masculine Japanese given name. Notable people with the name include:

Tamotsu Asakura, Japanese footballer
 (born 1929), Japanese cyclist
 (born 1970), Japanese footballer
 (1900–1946), Imperial Japanese Navy admiral
 (born 1947), Japanese footballer and manager
 (died 1973), Japanese photographer

See also
9096 Tamotsu, main-belt asteroid

Japanese masculine given names